Pádraig Pearse's GAC Kilrea is a Gaelic Athletic Association club based in Kilrea, County Londonderry, Northern Ireland. The club is a member of the Derry GAA and currently caters for both Gaelic football and Camogie. The club is named after Irish patriot Pádraig Pearse.

Underage teams up to U-12s play in South Derry league and championships, from U-14 upwards teams compete in All-Derry competitions.

2019 Championship Football

2018 Championship Football

2017 Championship Football

History
The first Kilrea Gaelic football club was established on 15 November 1943. The club was named O'Cahan's Kilrea and played in blue and gold jerseys. Many of the inaugural Minor team of 1946 went on to help Kilrea win the Junior Championship in 1951. In the early 1950s the club changed its name to the Kevin Barry's, named after the patriot Kevin Barry and played in black and amber colours. Its nickname was "the B's".

Soon after, in 1956, the current club, Pádraig Pearse's GAC Kilrea, was formed, and chose to play in red and white jerseys. The club won Junior League and South Derry Championships before moving to compete in Senior football in 1958.

In 1966 the Pearses won the inaugural Under 16 Championship. Part of that team was Martin O'Neill, who would later go onto play professional soccer and manage Glasgow Celtic and Aston Villa. Members of this team went on to win the County Minor title in 1970. The club won the 1971 Derry Junior Football Championship and won the Derry Intermediate Championship four years later.

History will be made with current squad, a fine mix of youth and experience will guide Kilrea to the JML.

Pearse Park
Work was commenced on Pearse Park in late 1977 and opened two years later. A second training pitch which was completed in 2001. A new club pavilion opened, with a dedicated club gym and four changing rooms, along with an upstairs functional room, in 2004. Pearse Park has remained at the same site on the Drumagarner Road since the club was founded.

Honours

Senior
Derry Intermediate Football Championship: 1
1975
Division 1 Senior Football League:1
 1981
Derry Junior Football Championship: 1
 1971
 Derry Senior Reserve Football Championship: 1 
 2013

Under-21
Derry Under-21 Football Championship:1
 2010

Minor
Ulster Minor Club Football Championship: 1
2008
Derry Minor Football Championship: 4
1970, 2004, 2007, 2016 
Derry Minor Football League: 2
2006, 2007, 2016
South Derry Minor Football Championship: 2
1970, 1990
South Derry Minor Football League: 2
1970, 1990

Under-16
Derry Under-16 Football Championship: 3
1966, 1987, 2005, 2015
South Derry Under-16 Football Championship: 3
1966, 1987, 2005
South Derry Under-16 Football League: 2
1983, 2005

Under-15
Ulster Óg Sport: 1
2006
Derry Óg Sport: 3
1982, 2006, 2008

Under-14

Derry Féile na nÓg: 2
2003, 2011
Derry Under-14 Football Championship: 3
2002, 2003, 2012
South Derry Under-14 Football Championship: 2
2002, 2003
South Derry Under-14 Football League: 3
1981, 2003, 2005
South Derry Under-14 'B' Football League: 2
1987, 2011

Camogie

Senior Derry Intermediate Camogie Championship: 2
2008,2010
Note: The above lists may be incomplete. Please add any other honours you know of.

Notable players
James Kielt

See also
Derry Senior Football Championship
List of Gaelic games clubs in Derry

External links
Kilrea GAC Website
Kilrea Camogie Club

References

Gaelic games clubs in County Londonderry
Gaelic football clubs in County Londonderry